Darr Sabko Lagta Hai (Hindi: डर सबको लगता है, English: Everybody feels fear) is an Indian anthology horror fiction television series, which premiered on 31 October 2015 and was broadcast on &TV. The series aired on every Saturday and Sunday nights. The series was produced by Reel Life Entertainment. Ending on 17 April 2016, two seasons of the series have been successfully aired. Bipasha Basu hosted the first season of the series.

Different directors helmed different episodes of the first season, including Soumik Sen, Chandra Pemmaraju, Suparn Verma,  Siraj Kalla, Faizal Akhtar, Devatma Mandal, Sarthak Dasgupta, Wilson Louis, Prashant Singh, Rakesh Ranshinge and Mayank Sharma. Tigmanshu Dhulia directed the second season.

Plot
The series is a supernatural fiction, which focuses on a different aspect of paranormal activity, such as ghosts, zombies, phantoms, undead persons, possessed objects and witches and wizards. The series aired on every Saturday and Sunday nights and telecasted two new fresh stories every week.

Cast
Each story had a different star cast. Sometimes the actors/actresses who had appeared in some episodes of the series reappeared in other episodes of the series. Various popular TV actors have been appeared in the series like Shahab Khan, Vipul Gupta, Ishita Ganguly, Sarika, Sachin Shroff, Kamya Panjabi, Hiten Tejwani, Kishori Shahane and Mohit Abrol.

Series overview

With a total run of 26 episodes, the first season of the series was ended on 24 January 2016. The first season was hosted by Bipasha Basu. The series was renewed for a second season and was aired on 30 January 2016. The host Bipasha Basu was no longer seen in the second season. The format of the series had been changed too. The show now focused more on haunting visuals.

Episodes

Reception
The series received mixed to positive reviews from critics. Kiran Kaur of Bollywood Life gave 3/5 stars to the series stating "The show is definitely a good attempt but has its flaws which are salvageable."

References

External links

Official Website on ZEE5

2015 Indian television series debuts
Hindi-language television shows
Indian horror fiction television series
Television shows set in Mumbai
&TV original programming
2016 Indian television series endings